Beniamin "Benia" Chkhikvishvili (also spelled Bénia Tchkhikvichvili, ; 1881–1924) was a Georgian politician who was involved in the Social Democratic movement in the early 20th century. An active member of the Menshevik party, he led the 1905 revolution in Guria ("Gurian Republic"), a Georgian province on the Black Sea. He became a de facto head of the peasant government, sometimes described by the contemporary observers as a "Gurian president" or even "Gurian king".

During the short-lived independent Democratic Republic of Georgia, he served as a mayor of Tiflis, the capital of Georgia (1919–1920). After the Soviet invasion of Georgia, he immigrated to France, where he became an official owner of the Leuville chateau, a residence of the Georgian government-in-exile.

He returned to Georgia in 1923 to take part in the preparations for a general uprising against the Bolshevik regime. He was arrested, however, and executed.

References

External links
(French) Ière République de Géorgie. 
(French) Ière République de Géorgie en exil .

1881 births
1924 deaths
Georgian emigrants to France
Georgian exiles
Revolutionaries from Georgia (country)
Mayors of Tbilisi
Mensheviks
People from Georgia (country) executed by the Soviet Union
People from Guria
People of the Russian Revolution
Russian Social Democratic Labour Party members
Social Democratic Party of Georgia politicians
Politicians from the Russian Empire